The Women's double trap event at the 2018 Commonwealth Games are being held on 11 April at the Belmont Shooting Centre, Brisbane. There was only a single part for the competition without any separate final unlike other events.

Results

Qualification

References

Womens double trap